Médéa (al-Madiya), population 123,535 (1998 census) is the capital city of Médéa Province, Algeria.  It is located roughly 68 km south of Algiers.

The present-day city is situated on the site of an ancient Roman military post and has a history dating back to the 10th century. The town is French in character, with a rectangular city plan, red tile-roofed buildings, and beautiful public gardens. The hills surrounding Médéa are covered with vineyards, orchards, and farms that yield abundant grain. Médéa's chief products are wines, irrigation equipment, and various handicrafts.

Etymology

Medea is a Roman city named ad Medix or Media ("halfway" in Latin), so called because it was equidistant from Tirinadi (Berrouaghia) and Sufnsar (Amourah) rest house of Mauretania caesarean on the road linking the capital Caesarea (Cherchell) to the colony Auzia (Aumale).

History
During the Roman Empire there was a settlement called Lamdia at Médéa.
During the Roman Empire the town of Lamdia, was the seat of an ancient Christian bishopric of the Roman province of Mauretania Caesariensis. Only one bishop of the town is known. The Donatist Felix, attended the 411 Conference of Carthage. The town at that time had no Catholic bishops. Today Lamdia survives as a titular bishopric of the Roman Church and the current bishop is Marian Eleganti, bishop of Chur.

Following the defeat of the Berbers in the 11th century, Arab tribes of Hilal and Sulaym descent were settled in the region, mixing with and Arabicizing the local Berbers.

Médéa was the capital of the Beylik of Titteri; a Bey, deputy of the Dey of Algiers, was resident there. The beylik of Titteri (chief Medea) was established in 1548. The last Bey Mostefa Boumezrag ran it from 1819 to 1830, when the French arrived. In 1837, after the Treaty of Tafna, Medea became one of the  capitals of the part of Algeria ruled by Abdelkader El Djezairi, but was occupied by the French when they eventually took possession of the whole of Algeria. Until 1962 Médéa was a garrison town for the French army.

Economy

One of the largest pharmaceutical production units in Algeria (Saidal-Antibiotical) is located in Medea.

Shoe factories also established in Takbou and M'Salah.

Notable people
 Mohamed Belhocine (born 1951), Algerian medical scientist, professor of internal medicine and epidemiology.
 Amine Megateli - Professional footballer
 Jean Richepin - French poet and writer, member of Académie française
 Djamel Tlemçani - Professional footballer
 Daniela Skokovic - author and librarian

See also

 Médéa Province

References

Populated places in Médéa Province
Cities in Algeria
Province seats of Algeria
Algeria